Hem Lumphat (4 December 1976 – 15 July 2020) was a Cambodian swimmer. He competed in the men's 200 metre individual medley event at the 1996 Summer Olympics.

References

External links
 

1976 births
2020 deaths
Cambodian male medley swimmers
Olympic swimmers of Cambodia
Swimmers at the 1996 Summer Olympics
Sportspeople from Phnom Penh